NA-104 Faisalabad-X is a constituency for the National Assembly of Pakistan.

Members of Parliament

2018-2022: NA-104 Faisalabad-X

Election 2002 

General elections were held on 10 Oct 2002. Raja Nadir Pervaiz of PML-N won by 41,448 votes.

Election 2008 

General elections were held on 18 Feb 2008. Muhammad Akram Ansari of PML-N won by 72,197 votes.

Election 2013 

General elections were held on 11 May 2013. Muhammad Akram Ansari of PML-N won by 124,591 votes and became the  member of National Assembly.

Election 2018 
General elections were held on 25 July 2018.

See also
NA-103 Faisalabad-IX
NA-105 Toba Tek Singh-I

References

External links
 Election result's official website

NA-085